The 2008–09 was the 41st season for the Northern Premier League Premier Division, and the second season for the Northern Premier League Division One North and South.

As continuing part of non-league restructuring, the Division One South temporarily has 20 teams, while the Division One North contains 21, with a targeted number for both of 22 teams. This will naturally affect the number of relegation slots available this season, as the league attempts to enlarge the size of the divisions at the end of the season.

Premier Division 

The Premier Division features six new clubs:
Leigh Genesis before Season as Leigh RMI, relegated from the Conference North
Boston United, relegated from the Conference North
Bradford Park Avenue, promoted from NPL Division One North
F.C. United of Manchester, promoted via play-offs from NPL Division One North
Cammell Laird, promoted from NPL Division One South
Nantwich Town, promoted via play-offs from NPL Division One South

League table

Results

Play-offs

Stadia and Locations

Division One North 

The Division One North features six new clubs:
F.C. Halifax Town, relegated from the Conference Premier
Colwyn Bay, transferred from NPL Division One South
Warrington Town, transferred from NPL Division One South
Salford City, promoted from North West Counties League Division One
Durham City, promoted from Northern League Division One
Trafford, promoted from North West Counties League Division One

League table

Results

Play-offs

Division One South 

The Division One South features seven new clubs:
Leek Town, relegated from the NPL Premier Division
Stamford, relegated from the NPL Premier Division
Lincoln United, relegated from the NPL Premier Division
Rushall Olympic, moved from the Southern League Division One Midlands
Willenhall Town, moved from the Southern League Division One Midlands
Glapwell, promoted from the Northern Counties East League Premier Division
Loughborough Dynamo, promoted from the Midland Football Alliance

League table

Results

Play-offs

Cup Results
Challenge Cup: Teams from all 3 divisions.

Guiseley 3–2 AET Ilkeston Town

President's Cup: Teams from lower 2 divisions.

Trafford 2–0 Quorn

Chairman's Cup: Between Champions of NPL Division 1 North and NPL Division 1 South.

Durham City 2–1 Retford United

Peter Swales Shield

The 2009 version of the Peter Swales Shield saw the champions of the 2008–09 NPL Premier Division, Eastwood Town, play against the winners of the 2009 NPL Chairman's Cup, Durham City.  Eastwood Town won the match 2–1.

References

External links
Official website
Official Northern Premier League Match Photo Gallery

Northern Premier League seasons
7